Eastwell is a village and ecclesiastical parish in Leicestershire, England.

The village's name means 'eastern spring/stream'.

For the purposes of administration Eastwell is part of the civil parish of Eaton that, in turn, forms part of the borough of Melton. Eastwell lost its own civil parish status on 1 April 1936. Its population in 1931 was recorded as 152; the 1851 census had recorded 158 so the village had not suffered the rural depopulation seen elsewhere.
There are 67 occupied dwellings in 2021 within the main village of Eastwell.

Further back in time:

Eastwell Church (St Michael) is built of ironstone. It dates mostly from the thirteenth century.

From the early 14th century to the mid 16th century, Eastwell was the seat of one branch of the Brabazon family.

The Hall is a Grade II* listed building  It dates from 1634 but has windows and a front door altered in the nineteenth century.

Eastwell Village Hall was re-built and opened in 2015 and hosts a variety of community events including a weekly community pub, exercise classes and live music events.

Iron Ore quarrying 
One factor which may have maintained the population was the extensive iron ore quarrying which took place in the western and southern parts of the parish. Quarrying began west of the road to Harby at the top of the scarp face. The quarrying began in 1881. The ore was taken down the scarp face by narrow-gauge tramway on a rope-worked incline to sidings on the Great Northern and London and North Western Joint Railway near Harby where it was loaded into railway wagons for transport to the iron works at Staveley, Derbyshire. As the quarries got further away from the incline  the tramway was gradually extended.and from 1884 the tramway between the quarries and the incline top  was worked by steam locomotives. Before that the wagons were pushed by hand or pulled by horses, the distance then being short. By 1913 the active quarries were either side of the Waltham Road close to the White Lodge. The tramway was then extended eastwards to serve new quarries at Eaton and Branston. Quarrying continued at Eastwell. The Eaton and Branston quarries that the tramway served closed in 1957. By 1959 the active quarry at Eastwell was on the south east side of the Scalford Road, west of the cross roads. The tramway was used only occasionally from then on and was taken up in 1961 and 1962. From 1959 the ore was taken by lorry to the railway sidings near Harby. The last quarry to be worked at Eastwell was on the east side of the Waltham Road, south of the White Lodge; it closed in 1967.

The quarrying was done by hand with the aid of explosives at first but steam diggers were introduced from 1915 and diesel machines from 1936.

As at 1988 some of the quarry buildings remained. The road bridge over the tramway at White Lodge was still there and quarry faces remained in two places east of the Waltham Road. Elsewhere the fields are smoothed over but sunken. Two of the Eastwell Tramway locomotives survive, Lord Granby and Nancy in working order at the Cavan and Leitrim Railway.

References

External links

 Eastwell Village Official Site

Villages in Leicestershire
Former civil parishes in Leicestershire
Borough of Melton